David Záizar was a Mexican mariachi singer and actor who appeared in many Mexican films. He was active from the 1940s up until his death in 1982 due to a respiratory infection. What earned him the title of the "Rey del Falsete" or "King of the Falsetto" was the fact that he displaced Miguel Aceves Mejía, who had the title until Záizar's appearance on the ranchera music scene. Initially, he joined forces with his brother, Juan Záizar, with whom he formed a duo. Prior to this, they had both been working on individual projects, especially Juan, who was a renowned composer and singer. They had only sung together for very special occasions, like their tribute to honor the famous ranchera composer, also from Jalisco, Pepe Guízar. Out of this union came the famous duo, Los Hermanos Záizar (the Záizar brothers). Like most Mexican folk songs, the majority of those interpreted by David that we have left today are about lost loves, unfaithful women, Mexico and its people, and several other topics commonly present throughout ranchera music.

His songs are considered an integral part of the Mexican musical heritage and are comparable, for instance, to Woody Guthrie's influence on American folk music.

In addition to his own recordings, many of his songs have been recorded successfully by renowned recording artists from around the Spanish-speaking world, most notably by Miguel Aceves Mejía, Pedro Infante, Rocío Dúrcal, Javier Solís, Pedro Fernández, Jorge Negrete, José Alfredo Jiménez, Vikki Carr, Luis Miguel, Lola Beltrán, Alejandro Fernández, Chavela Vargas, Maná, Antonio Aguilar, Vicente Fernández, Julio Iglesias, Joaquín Sabina, Manolo García, Los Tigres del Norte, and Gualberto Castro.

Partial list of songs 

1930 births
1982 deaths
Mexican male film actors
Male actors from Jalisco
20th-century Mexican male actors
20th-century Mexican male singers
Singers from Jalisco